Gildo Olímpio Sena Monteiro (born 20 April 1991), simply known as Júnior, is a Cape Verdean professional footballer who plays as a winger.

Club career
On June 19, 2017, it was confirmed that Júnior had joined LigaPro side União da Madeira.

On 12 August 2018, after suffering team relegation, Júnior signed for Académica de Coimbra.

International career
Júnior made his debut for the Cape Verde national football team in a 0-0 (4-3) penalty shootout win over Andorra on 3 June 2018.

References

External links

1991 births
Living people
Sportspeople from Praia
Cape Verdean footballers
Cape Verde international footballers
Association football midfielders
Liga Portugal 2 players
A.D. Camacha players
C.D. Pinhalnovense players
C.F. União players
Associação Académica de Coimbra – O.A.F. players
Leixões S.C. players
C.D. Cova da Piedade players
F.C. Arouca players
Cape Verdean expatriate footballers
Cape Verdean expatriate sportspeople in Portugal
Expatriate footballers in Portugal